Diana Anphimiadi (also Romanized Anpimiadi, Anfimiadi; born 1982) is a Georgian poet, journalist, publicist, linguist and teacher.

Early life
Anphimiadi was born in Tbilisi in 1982. She has Pontic Greek ancestry. She attended Ivane Javakhishvili Tbilisi State University, studying the Georgian languages, and later received a Master's in linguistics.

Career

Anphimiadi released her first work in 2008, winning  first prize in the 2008 Tsero (Crane) literary contest and the Saba literary award for best first collection. As well as several poetry collections, she published a selection of stories, memories and recipes in 2012, entitled Personal Cuisine.

A chapbook of her work was published in 2018 in English, and a full collection of her work (Why I No Longer Write Poems) in 2022 by Bloodaxe Books. According to her publisher, "Her award-winning work reflects an exceptionally curious mind and glides between classical allusions and surreal imagery. She revivifies ancient myths and tests the reality of our senses against the limits of sense. Boldly inventive, prayers appear alongside recipes, dance lessons next to definitions. Her playful, witty lyricism offers a glimpse of the eternal in the everyday." In The Guardian, Fiona Sampson called it "gorgeous, fabulising verse." Why I No Longer Write Poems won a PEN Translates Award.

In 2021, some of her poetry was published in French translation as part of an anthology of Georgian women's poetry.

Bibliography

Poetry
In Georgian:
 შოკოლადი shok’oladi ("Chocolate", 2008)
 კონსპექტური მითოლოგია k’onsp’ekt’uri mitologia ("Resumé of Mythology", 2009)
 ალჰლო-ხედვის ტრაექტორია alhlo-khedvis t’raekt’oria ("Trajectory of the Short-Sighted", 2012)
 ჩრდილის მოჭრა chrdilis moch’ra ("Cutting the Shadow", 2015)

Parallel English and Georgian: (both translated by Natalia Bukia-Peters and Jean Sprackland)
Beginning to Speak (2018)
Why I No Longer Write Poems (2022)

Prose
 პირადი კულინარია p’iradi k’ulinaria ("Personal Cuisine", 2012)

Personal life

Anphimiadi lives in Tbilisi with husband and her son, who has autism. She is currently preparing a doctoral dissertation at Ivane Javakhishvili Tbilisi State University.

References

Georgian people of Greek descent
1982 births
Women poets from Georgia (country)
21st-century poets from Georgia (country)
Writers from Tbilisi
Tbilisi State University alumni
Living people